Bankoff is a surname. Notable people with the surname include:
André Bankoff (born 1978), Brazilian actor
Jim Bankoff (born 1969), American businessman
Leon Bankoff (1908–1997), American mathematician
S. George Bankoff (1921–2011), American chemical engineer
Simeon Bankoff (born 1970), American activist
George Sava (born George Alexis Bankoff; 1902–1996), Russian-born British surgeon